Deçan is a city in west-central Kosovo.

Deçan may also refer to:

 Deçan Municipality, an administrative municipality surrounding Deçan
 Decani, church interior
 Visoki Dečani, a monastery in Deçan